A long-lived, destructive tornado outbreak sequence caused widespread impacts across the entire United States between May 14-June 1, 1962. 198 tornadoes were recorded during this timeframe and even more tornadoes occurred in the days following the outbreak sequence. It was part of a period between May 14 and June 25 where at least one tornado touched down every day.

Confirmed tornadoes

May 14 event

May 15 event

May 16 event

May 17 event

May 18 event

May 19 event

May 20 event

May 21 event
 Grazulis listed two unofficial F2 tornadoes on this date:
 An F2 tornado destroyed barns on four farms near White Lake and Plankinton, South Dakota.
 An F2 tornado destroyed barns and agricultural implements near Armour, South Dakota.

May 22 event

May 23 event

May 24 event

May 25 event

May 26 event

May 27 event

May 28 event

May 29 event

May 30 event

May 31 event

June 1 event

See also
 List of North American tornadoes and tornado outbreaks
 List of tornadoes in the tornado outbreak sequence of May 2019

Notes

References

Tornadoes of 1962